The 2014 Pan American Men's Club Handball Championship took place in Taubaté from 28 May to 1 June. It acts as the Pan American qualifying tournament for the 2014 IHF Super Globe.

Teams
 Colegio Ward
 SAG Villa Ballester
 Handebol Taubaté
 EC Pinheiros
 Luterano de Valparaíso

Results

Round robin

Final standing

References

External links
PATHF Official tournament website

Pan American Men's Club Handball Championship
2014 in handball
2014 in Brazilian sport
Pan American